Ōkimi (Ōkimi, Daiō) or Ame no shita Siroshimesu Ōkimi (Chi Tenka Daiō) is the title of the head of the Yamato Kingship or the monarch title of Wakoku (Old Japan) from the Kofun period through the Asuka period in ancient Japan.

The terms 
The title "" (Ōkimi or Daiō), which is an honorific title for the head (king) of the Yamato Kingship, was established around the 5th century and was used until 680s when the compilation of the Asuka Kiyomihara Code started. There are several theories upon whether the title holder in the early period is a king of the unified kingship or not. 
Ōkimi in Japanese reading is created by adding the prefix "ō/oho," which indicates greatness and particular nobleness, to the title "kimi" (lord), which indicates a master or nobleman. However, another theory states that "Ōkimi" is only an honorific form of "kimi," that is the title of Japan, but title Daiō originated from China, which is based on donated king title, that is, the title of kango (Chinese word). There are many instances of using "", which is understood as a courtesy title of Emperor or royal family.

Title of King of Japan appeared in the Chinese documents

King title in the ancient China 
The kanji title "" (Ō, Wang) originally designated a Master of Chūgen (Zhongyuan) in the Inner China. In the Zhou dynasty period,  (Wang) was the title of the sole Son of Heaven who rules the Tianxia. However, some great powers in the region of the Yangtze civilization who did not want to stand in subordinate positions of the nations of the Yellow River civilization in the North China, such as Chu, Wu and Yue. Some of their monarchs titled themselves Wang.

When China entered into the Warring States period, the monarchs of the great nations among the states of North China who were originally subjects of the Zhou King, but achieved territorial statehood, called themselves sole Wang of the Tianxia in place of Zhou King. Thus, the mainland China was flooded with many kings. Thereafter, Ying Zheng, the King of Qin (Emperor Shi Huang), who unified China for the first time (221 BC), adopted the title "Emperor" (Huángdì) instead of title, "King" which had been degraded. King title Wang changed to the title which are granted to subjects of the Emperor, or the title which are donated to a head of neighboring states who recognized the authority of the Qin Emperor as Master of Tianxia, and presented subordinating attitude. The latter usage was established thereafter. (The monarch of Xiongnu stood on even ground with the Emperor of Qin, Therefore, his title was Chanyu, not Wang).

Early king title of Japan 

Then, the word Wakoku ō (King of Wa) appears in the article dated to the first year of Eisho (107 AD), in the record of Emperor An in the Book of the Later Han. As written in the record of emperor An, that is: "Suishō, the king of Wa, and other," if we think "Wakoku ō" means King of Wakoku as a head of the states union, other than a head of small regional state, this description shows the establishment of the Wakoku.

Also Himiko (year of the death is between 240 and 249 AD) was authorised as the unified Queen of Wakoku (whose capital was Yamatai koku) by the Wei dynasty. There is the theory that the government of this Himiko was the Yamato Kingship at the earliest stage (though there are disagreements).

Establishment of Daiō (Great King) expression 
Then, Sai (Ingyō) may not be  (great king), but king. As to King Wakatakeru (Emperor Yūryaku), who is identified with King Bu, there is the inscription  on the iron sword, unearthed from the Inariyama Kofun, Saitama prefecture, besides, there is the inscription  on the iron sword, unearthed from the Eta Funayama Kofun, Kumamoto prefecture. From these inscriptions, it is supposed that Yūryaku might use the title "Chi Tenka Daiō" inside Japan. It also suggests the title "Chi Tenka Daiō" was born in those days (late 5th century).

In Nihon Shoki, compiled in the Nara period, there is the scripts "" (Daiō, fūshi...) in the Enthronement record 1 of Ohosazaki no Sumeramikoto (Emperor Nintoku), but it is not certain that this Daiō had been used from the days of Emperor Nintoku, far distant before the compilation of Nihon Shoki. However, the expression of Daiō first appears in the Ōjin record, and after that, it appears in the Ingyō record, Yūryaku record, Kenzō record and Keitai record etc.

There is the inscription  (according to Toshio Fukuyama)  on the Jinbutsu-gazō Kyō (Portrait of person Mirror), owned by Suda Hachiman Shrine (ja), Wakayama prefecture, in which the words  and  appear. From this inscription, in the year Mizunoto Hitsuji (Kibi)  when the mirror was made, the title Daiō is supposed to have been used. But there are various interpretations of what year this Mizunoto Hitsuji year was. In several theories, it is: 383, 443, 503, or 623 AD. Among these years, 443 (Emperor Ingyō) or 503 (Emperor Buretsu) are considered dominant. If it is 443, the expression Daiō was used in around the age of Ingyō, in the middle 5th century. But the characters in the inscription are difficult to interpret. In addition, the content of the inscription itself has various interpretations. The exact years when the expression Daiō started to be used is unclear.  

In the Man'yōshū, the expression  is the most common, and 57 examples appear. However, all these words are read "Ōkimi", "Ohokimi". and there are no examples that single character  is read "Kimi". The word  is rarely used. There are only several examples such as the line  (Yasumishi shi waga ōkimi...) by Kakinomoto no Hitomaro.

References

See also 
 Suishō
 Emperor of Japan
 Kofun period
 Asuka period
 Five kings of Wa

Japanese monarchs
History of Nara Prefecture
Royal titles
Asuka period
Kofun period
Pages with unreviewed translations